Uwe Mund may refer to:

Uwe Mund (conductor) (born 1941), Austrian conductor
Uwe Mund (rower) (born 1962), German rower